Per state law in Nebraska, all communities with a population above 1000 residents are to be connected to the state highway system.  Prior to the 1970s, short spur routes that were offshoots of main highways were given route numbers based on the main highway.  The spurs were numbered sequentially from west to east or north to south and prefixed to the main route's number.  For instance, the spur from U.S. Highway 6 (US 6) into Champion was numbered Spur 106 and the spur from US 183 into Huntley was Spur 2183.

In 1970, the Nebraska Department of Roads gave all of the state spurs new route numbers.  The change was initiated to create a system of secondary highways that was expandable and followed a pattern.  The new route numbers were given a letter prefix of S, L, or R, for Spur, Link, or Recreation Road, respectively, a number which identified the county in alphabetical order, and a letter suffix identified each particular route.  For instance, Spur 208 into Liberty was renumbered S-34A and Spur 715 into Western was renumbered S-76C.

List of routes

References

External links
Nebraska Department of Roads
Nebraska Roads

 
Spur